Samihah Kharis (born 16 August 1956) is a Jordanian novelist, journalist and translator. She was born in Amman in 1956, and completed her primary and Secondary school education in Qatar and Sudan, respectively, and her university education in Egypt. For around 20 years, Kharis held a number of positions in the field of journalism, including editor-in-chief for Hatem magazine, and writer for Al-Ittihad newspaper, among many other newspapers. She served as one of the board members of the Radio and Television Department and PEN International, and one of the founders of Emirates Writers Union. She has published over 15 literary works, and was nominated for a number of literary prizes, most notably, Katara Prize for Arabic Novel in 2017.

Education 
She completed her primary education and a part of her secondary education in Qatar. Due to the nature of her father's diplomatic post, Kharis resumed her secondary education in Sudan, and, in 1973, graduated from the literary branch of Khartoum Old High Secondary School for Girls. In 1978, she obtained her bachelor's degree in Sociology from Cairo University in Egypt. She has high proficiency in the Arabic and English languages.

Career 
Kharis first started working in the field of journalism, and wrote for some of the well-known Arab newspapers, including Al-Ittihad Emirati newspaper for over 15 years, namely from 1981 to 1998, Al-Dustour daily Egyptian newspaper in 1998, and Al Ra'i Jordanian newspaper. A year later, she was appointed director of the Cultural Department of Al Ra'i newspaper, and editor-in-chief of Hatem, which is a children's magazine issued by the newspaper. In 2009, she served as a board member of the Radio and Television Department and, in 2010, of Jordan News Agency (Petra). In addition, she was a member of many cultural associations and bodies, including the Jordanian Writers Association, Jordan Press Association and PEN International. Kharis is also one of the founding members of Emirates Writers Union.

During her period of work in the field of literature, Kharis published novels, wrote television and radio scripts, and translated a selection of Jordanian stories into English. Her literary works gained a wide recognition; some of which are novels and were translated, such as "The Notebook of Floods" into German and Spanish, and "The Plate" into German, while others are literary writings featured in Arab and Jordanian newspapers. In the years 2002 and 2003, her novels, "The Tree of Leopards," “Poppy" and "The Notebook of Floods," were broadcast by Jordan Radio and Television Corporation as a radio show. Another novel, "Crimea," was aired as a television show under the name, "The Night and the Dessert." Kharis was awarded at the Cairo Festival for Radio and Television for several years for many of her novels, including "The Tree of Leopards," “Poppy" and "Crimea.”

Reviews about the author's works 

 "Through her writings, Kharis details the lives of different women and observes its maspects. In gentle words, she explores their psychological aura, and digs deep into their consciousness. The women’s worlds, she narrates, challenge a writer’s pen, for the women stand boldly before their concerns with an open, energetic conscious. They combat their way towards establishing a new version of themselves, one that is rooted from their own personal experiences," says the Iraqi critic, Uruk Abbas.
 " “The Plate" is one of those novels after which you read, you continue to feel the presence of its characters as they linger in your bedroom and wreak havoc underneath your bed sheets. Moreover, you continue to explore your other senses in which you feel the warmth of the characters’ bodies against your skin, and smell a strong peachy fragrance, and even feel its sweet fluid drip from within your fingers," says the figurative artists, Rana Hatamleh.
 "Kharis's novels pose as a leap in Modern Arabic literature, and continue to raise questions among critics regarding Kharis's choice of semantic elements and methodological approaches in composing her writings. Through such approaches, Kharis monitors the operating mechanisms utilized, as means to prevent the unfolding of the essence of her writings in a reported manner, the interference of narrative entities, and the  sudden transition from one entity to another, and, despite that, Kharis composed her writings in such detail as though she was crawling through the hallways of her utterances," says the Algerian critic, Dr. Rachid Ben Malek.

Works

Semi-autobiographical novels about Samihah Kharis 

 "Samihah Kharis: An Insight into Fictional Experience” by Dr. Nidal Al-Saleh
 “The Narrative structures of Samihah Kharis’s novels” by Dr. Nizar Qubeilat
 “Vision and Art: The Formation of the Narrative Discourse by Samihah Kharis” by Dr. Ibrahim Melhem
 “The Gardens of Women” by Nazih Abu Nidal

Novels 

 “My Journey” (original title: Rehlaty), Dar Al-Haitham, Beirut, 1980.
 "The Tide" (original title: Al-Madd), Dar Al-Shorouk, Amman, 1990.
 "The Tree of Leopards: The Sharing of Life” (original title: Shajarat Al-Fuhood: Taqaseem Al-Hayaah), Dar Al-Karmel For Publishing & Distribution, Amman, 1995.
 "The Tree of Leopards: The Sharing of Passion” (original title: Shajarat Al-Fuhood: Taqaseem Al-‘Eshq), Sharqiyat Publishing House, Cairo, 1997.
 "Crimea" (original title: Al-Qurumiyah), Greater Amman Municipality publications, Amman, 1998.
 "Poppy" (original title: Khashash), The Centre for Arab Unity, Beirut, 2000.
 "The Notebook of Floods" (original title: Dafaatir Al-Tawafaan), Greater Amman Municipality publications, Amman, 2003 (first edition), and Al-Dar Al-Masriah Al-Lubnaniah, Cairo 2004 (second edition).
 "The Plate" (original title: Al-Sahn), Dar Azminah For Publishing & Distribution, Amman, 2003.
 "Nara: The Paper Empire” (original title: Imbraturiy-it Waraq), Dar Nara for Publishing & Distribution Amman, 2007
 "Dancing with the Devil" (original title: Al-Raqs Ma’ Al-Shaytaan), Dar Nara for Publishing & Distribution, Amman, 2008.
 "Us" (original title: Nahn-u), Dar Nara for Publishing & Distribution, Amman, 2009.
 "Yahya" (original title: Yahya), Dar Thaqafaat, Beirut, 2010, and Arab Scientific Publishers House, Beirut, 2010.
 "On a Bird’s Wing" (original title: ‘Ala Ginaah Al-Tayr), Dar Al-Hiwar, Latakia, 2011.

Story collections 

 "With the Land" (original title: Ma’ Al-Ard), Dar Al-Ayyam, Khartoum, 1978.
 "Orchestra" (original title: Orkestra), Dar Al-Kindi, Irbid, 1996.

Collective work 

 Composed a story from among "Stories from Jordan" story collection (original title: Qisas Min Al-Urdun), Jordanian Writers Association.
 Translated a story from among a selection of Jordanian stories into English.

Awards 

 The State Incentive Award in recognition to "The Tree of Leopards" novel, Jordan Ministry of Culture, Amman, 1997.
 Gold medal for Kharis's integrated work, Cairo International Festival for Contemporary & Experimental Theatre, Cairo, 2002.
 Aboul-Qacem Echebbi Award in recognition to "The Notebook of Floods" novel, Tunisia, 2004.
 Arab Creativity Award on Kharis's overall work, Arab Thought Foundation, Beirut, 2008.
 State Appreciation and Encouragement Award in the field of literature (collaborative work), Jordan, 2014.
 The Order of Al Hussein for Distinguished Contributions, Jordan, 2015.
 Katara Prize for Arabic Novel in recognition to "Abid’s Peanuts" novel (original title: Fustuq Abid) novel, underneath the category of published novels in the year 2017.

References 

Living people
1956 births
Jordanian women writers
Jordanian novelists
Jordanian journalists
Jordanian women novelists
Jordanian women journalists
Jordanian translators
Jordanian screenwriters
Women screenwriters
Cairo University alumni